Abd ol Manaf (also Romanized as ‘Abd ol Manāf) is a village in Larijan-e Sofla Rural District, Larijan District, Amol County, Mazandaran Province, Iran. At the 2006 census, its population was 52, in 16 families.

References 

Populated places in Amol County